Sir Nicholas Carew, 1st Baronet (6 February 1687 – 18 March 1727), of Beddington, near Croydon was a landowner and Whig politician who sat in the House of Commons between 1708 and 1727.

Carew was only surviving son and heir of Sir Francis Carew (died 1689) and his wife Anne Boteler, daughter of William Boteler.  His father was a great-grandson of Sir Nicholas Throckmorton, who had changed his name to Carew on inheriting the Beddington estate from his maternal uncle, Sir Francis Carew (died 1611). Carew was two years old when he succeeded to Beddington on the death of his father aged 26 on 29 September 1689. By this time the house was in a state of neglect. He was admitted at St. Catharine's College, Cambridge in April 1703. He married Elizabeth Hackett, daughter of Nicholas Hackett of North Crawley, Buckinghamshire (with £2,000) on 2 February 1709.

Carew's uncle Nicholas was politically active, tried unsuccessfully to enter Parliament and provided encouragement to his nephew. Carew was returned unopposed as Member of Parliament for Haslemere at a by-election on 13 December 1708. He made little impression in Parliament and lost his seat at the 1710 general election. He did not stand at the 1713 general election, but was returned for Haslemere again at a by-election on 18 March 1714. He was created a baronet on 11 January 1715. At the 1715 general election he was elected, after a scrutiny of the poll, as Whig MP for Haslemere. He supported the Administration, with the exception of the Peerage Bill. At the 1722 general election, he changed seats and was elected MP for Surrey.

Carew died at the age of 40 on 18 March 1727, just before the general election. He and his wife had two sons and two daughters. He was succeeded in the baronetcy by his second but only surviving son, Nicholas Hacket Carew. His widow married William Chetwynd, a former MP for Wooton Bassett. She died in February 1740 at Marlborough, Wiltshire, while travelling to the spa town of Bath, Somerset.

References

External links

1687 births
1727 deaths
Alumni of St Catharine's College, Cambridge
Baronets in the Baronetage of Great Britain
Members of the Parliament of Great Britain for English constituencies
British MPs 1708–1710
British MPs 1713–1715
British MPs 1715–1722
British MPs 1722–1727
Nicholas
People educated at Whitgift School
Carew baronets